The Eleven Arrows are a professional Namibian football club from Walvis Bay. They play in the country's highest division, the Namibia Premier League.

Achievements
Namibia Premier League: 1
1991
NFA-Cup: 1
2011

Performance in CAF competitions
African Cup of Champions Clubs: 1 appearance
1992: Preliminary Round

References

External links
 

1961 establishments in South West Africa
Association football clubs established in 1961
Football clubs in Namibia
Namibia Premier League clubs
Walvis Bay